The University of Toronto Campus Safety Division (formerly the University of Toronto Campus Police) was created in 1904 as the campus police service of the University of Toronto. It has jurisdiction over 80,000 students, faculty and staff, in addition to the thousands of visitors to the University each day.

The division is commanded by three Police (Special Constable) managers assigned to each campus (St. George, Scarborough and Mississauga-Erindale). Several platoons have been organized, which consist of Staff Sergeants, Corporals and Constables. These platoons of officers provide policing services to the University around the clock, 365 days per year. Each platoon consists of specialized officers who are trained in general and advanced patrol functions. In addition, officers are also trained in advanced criminal investigation functions, including SOCO (scene of crime officer). Campus Safety SOCO officers will examine crime scenes for trace evidence and submit their findings to the Toronto Police Forensic Identification Unit.

University of Toronto Campus Safety Special Constables are sworn in as Peace Officers through the Toronto Police and Peel Police Services Boards after being approved by the Provincial Ministry of Community Safety and Correctional Services. Special Constables are appointed as Peace Officers under the Ontario Police Services Act. This appointment under the Act confers police authority on Campus Safety officers as per the agreement with Toronto and Peel Regional Police Services Boards. Campus Safety officers possess powers of arrest, search and seizure. They also have the authority and discretion to lay criminal and provincial offence charges. Offenders who are taken into custody by University of Toronto Campus Police are transported to city/regional police detention centers for holding and processing. Campus Safety provides policing services specific to the university sector, which otherwise may not be provided by the jurisdictional police. Criminal/provincial offence occurrences which occur within the University community are investigated by Campus Safety, who prepare jurisdictional police reports which are then submitted to Toronto or Peel Police as per the Special Constable Service agreement.

In 2019, the Government of Ontario passed the Comprehensive Police Services Act (Bill 68) which revoked Special Constable services' rights to call themselves "police" services. Under the new law, only municipal and provincial law enforcement agencies authorized by the Solicitor General of Ontario may call themselves "Police" departments. Accordingly, the University of Toronto Campus Police rebranded itself as "Campus Safety" and re-outfitted all its liveries and visual media. The rebranding was completed in 2021.

Jurisdiction

The U of T Campus Safety Division has Peace Officer authority for all areas of the University of Toronto campus as well as roads abutting the property. Furthermore, they have police authority away from the University as long as the original offence occurred on or in relation to the University of Toronto, within the City of Toronto or Region of Peel.

Responsibility
The Campus Safety division enforces the following statutes:

Criminal Code of Canada
Controlled Drugs and Substances Act
Trespass to Property Act of Ontario
Liquor Licence Act of Ontario
Section 17 of the Mental Health Act of Ontario
Selected municipal by-laws

In addition, Campus Safety enforce parts of the University of Toronto Student Code of Conduct.

Campus Safety patrol in marked vehicles which are designed to be easily identifiable to the public. Officers also patrol on foot and on mountain bikes.

Community Response Unit (CRU)

In addition to the uniform presence/primary response that the Campus Safety provide, the CRU  works behind the scenes on an array of projects which include but are not limited to:

 Case Management (Criminal and Provincial offences)
 Property and Evidence Management
 VIP visits / Special Events
 Crime Prevention / CPTED auditing (Crime Prevention Through Environmental Design)
 Intelligence, Investigations & Follow up

Several officers with the University of Toronto Campus Safety are SOCOs (Scene of Crime Officers) who are designated to process crime scenes and collect evidence. Evidence that the Campus Police may collect is then forwarded to the Toronto Police Forensic Identification Services for further investigation and evaluation. Fingerprints recovered from crime scenes are entered into AFIS (Automated Fingerprint Identification System) and compared against fingerprints on file. DNA evidence is also collected and submitted.

Community-Based Policing Initiatives 
The University of Toronto Campus Safety place a major emphasis on Community Based Policing. Officers have implemented the following programs to address the needs of the community:

 Alcohol / Drug Safety Day
 Bicycle Anti-Theft Programs
 Bicycle and Pedestrian Safety Rodeo
 Building Watch Program
 Business Crime Watch Program
 CPTED Auditing
 First-Year Orientation Program
 Lock It or Lose It Program
 Safety Awareness Week
 STOP Anti Theft Program
 Student Partnership Program
 Working Alone
 Youth Education and Safety Program (aimed at the University of Toronto high school students)
 LGBTQ / First Nations Liaison
 Huron / Sussex Resident's Association (Faculty Housing) Liaison

Broader community events that the division participates in are Cops For Cancer, the Law Enforcement Torch Run and food drive initiatives.

High Profile Events Investigated by U of T Campus Safety 

 Ghost Hunt Turns Deadly at U of T, September 2009
 Fine Arts Professor Murdered at the U of T, 2001
 Medical Sciences Morgue Homicide, April 1998 (1)
 Medical Sciences Morgue Homicide, April 1998 (2)

Recruiting
Campus Safety Special Constable recruiting occurs infrequently. Applicants who are successful in the initial stage will undergo a Toronto Police and/or Peel Police Services background investigation prior to an official offer of employment. Potential candidates must also successfully complete the prescribed ATS (Applicant Testing Services) tests prior to submitting their application. Candidates for the position will also undergo panel interviews, extensive background investigations, home/neighbour interviews, fingerprint submission, medical testing, written testing and psychological testing by a registered Psychologist. Once the candidate has passed the background investigation and testing, they will be deferred to the Peel/Toronto Police Services board for approval. Once approval from the board(s) is granted, the Ministry of Community Safety and Correctional Services will review the request and grant Peace Officer status to the appointee to carry out the above functions at their respective campus.

Controversy

The Campus Safety Division has faced controversy for its enforcement actions. In 2019, several student and faculty groups protested the division's arrest of a student at the Mississauga Campus. The student was allegedly having a mental health issue and had reported suicidal thoughts. At the time, Campus Safety stated that they had merely enforced university protocols, and restrained the student to prevent harm to themselves and to others. Subsequently, the University launched a review of the role of Campus Safety in responding to mental health-related emergencies.

Additionally, following protests during the 2020-21 United States racial unrest, some of which have occurred in Canada, several student groups have called for either the defunding or abolition of the Campus Safety Division – part of the 'Defund the Police' movement. The university has not accepted their demands.

Ranks

 Director
 Associate Director
 Staff Sergeant
 Sergeant (Rank currently not in use)
 Corporal (Platoon/Shift Supervisor)
 Special Constables (1st to 4th Class)

References

External links
 University of Toronto Campus Police Service Website

Law enforcement agencies of Ontario
University of Toronto
Campus security services in Canada